The Way to the Lantern is a 1961 historical novel by the British writer Audrey Erskine Lindop. An English actor and confidence trickster rises to prominence during the era of the French Revolution.

References

Bibliography
 Vinson, James. Twentieth-Century Romance and Gothic Writers. Macmillan, 1982.

1961 British novels
Novels by Audrey Erskine Lindop
British historical novels
Novels set in France
Novels set in the 18th century
William Collins, Sons books